The Master of Arts in Teaching (MAT) or Master of Science in Teaching (MST) degree is generally a pre-service degree that usually requires a minimum of 30 semester hours beyond the bachelor's degree. While the program often requires education classes in order to meet state license requirements, it emphasizes advanced coursework in a specific academic discipline to enhance one's knowledge in that subject area.  Furthermore, it focuses on educating the candidate in practical teaching skills for use as a teacher as opposed to focusing on performing research in the educational field. Candidates usually spend a semester as a full time student teacher in order to earn the degree. There are two general models that (MAT or MST) degrees follow: a 5th year model, in which students spend one year extra beyond their bachelor’s degree to earn a master's degree and an initial teaching license, or a "Flex" program, which usually offers part-time weekend and evening courses to accommodate professionals who are changing careers. Some universities title this degree  Master of Arts in Education.

The Master of Arts or Master of Science in Teaching degree is often advantageous to middle school and secondary school teachers because it allows them to focus on subject area knowledge in their undergraduate program and then acquire pedagogical skills in their graduate studies.

Although there is no set standard in determining whether a program is to be an MAT or MST, the difference between them can often be observed to MAT programs focusing more on enhancing knowledge of subject area with optional courses steered towards advanced coursework and content while MST programs in "more effective teaching methods" with optional courses towards better understanding and applying education pedagogy.

They differ from the Master of Education (M.Ed) degree, which is usually designed for practicing teachers or those who desire to serve as counselors (school or otherwise) or as educational administrators.

References

Master's degrees